Local elections were held in San Juan on Monday, May 9, 2022, as part of the 2022 Philippine general election.

Background 
Incumbent Francis Zamora was elected mayor of San Juan in 2019 and will seek a second consecutive term. He will face former Batis barangay councilor and current San Juan Knights team manager Felix "Jun" Usman, who will represent the Ejercito family-led group.

Candidates

Administration coalition

Primary opposition coalition

Other candidates

Results

Mayoral election
Incumbent Francis Zamora defended his seat against Felix Usman.

Vice Mayoral election
Incumbent Warren Villa won for his second term against former Vice Mayor Philip Cezar.

District Representative election
Ronaldo Zamora was on his third consecutive term and was barred to seek reelection due to term limits. His party nominated his daughter, Bel Zamora. She defeated Jana Ejercito, the only member of the Ejercito clan who ran for the local post in San Juan.

Council election

District 1

|-bgcolor=black
|colspan=5|

District 2

|-bgcolor=black
|colspan=5|

Opinion polling

References

2022 Philippine local elections
Elections in San Juan, Metro Manila
May 2022 events in the Philippines
2022 elections in Metro Manila